Haslingden is a town in Rossendale, Lancashire, England, and close to it are the communities of Helmshore, Ewood Bridge, and Irwell Vale. The area contains 48 buildings that are recorded in the National Heritage List for England as designated listed buildings. Of these, three are listed at Grade II*, the middle grade, and the others are at Grade II, the lowest grade. Until the coming of the Industrial Revolution the area was agricultural, and almost all the earliest listed buildings are farmhouses and farm buildings. With the arrival of industry, first came weavers' cottages and then mills, some of which are listed. As the population grew, buildings to serve the community were constructed. Listed examples of these include churches and associated structures, and a public house. The East Lancashire Railway passes through the area, and viaducts built to carry it are listed. In addition the gateway to a public park and two war memorials are listed.

Key

Buildings

Notes and references

Notes

Citations

Sources

 
 
 
 
 
 
 
 
 
 
 
 
 
 
 
 
 
 
 
 
 
 
 
 
 
 
 
 
 
 
 
 
 
 
 
 
 
 
 
 
 
 
 
 
 
 
 
 
 
 

Lists of listed buildings in Lancashire
Buildings and structures in the Borough of Rossendale